The 1900 Alabama Crimson White football team (variously "Alabama", "UA" or "Bama") represented the University of Alabama in the 1900 Southern Intercollegiate Athletic Association football season. The team was led by head coach Malcolm Griffin, in his first season, and played their home games at The Quad in Tuscaloosa and one game at North Birmingham Park in Birmingham, Alabama. In what was the eighth season of Alabama football, the team finished with a record of two wins and three losses (2–3, 1–3 SIAA).

The Crimson White opened the season with three consecutive games at The Quad. After a shutout victory over the Taylor School, Alabama opened SIAA play with a 12–5 victory over Ole Miss. However, the Crimson White did proceed to lose their final three games en route to a 2–3 record. After a 6–0 loss to Tulane, Alabama traveled to Montgomery where they were defeated 53–5 by Auburn and closed the season with a 35–0 loss to Clemson at Birmingham.

Schedule

Scoring note:

Game summaries

Taylor School
Alabama opened the season against the Taylor School, a preparatory school in Birmingham and defeated them 23–0. In the victory, A. M. Donahoo scored two and both James Forman and Arthur Walter Stewart each scored one touchdown in this shutout victory.

Ole Miss

Alabama opened SIAA play with a 12–5 victory over the University of Mississippi. Alabama scored first on a short Earl Drennen touchdown run, and with the successful PAT took a 6–0 lead. Mississippi responded with their only touchdown of the game shortly before the half on a short run to make the score 6–5 after a failed PAT. Arthur Walter Stewart then scored the final points of the game late in the second half on a short run to make the final score 12–5. The victory brought Alabama's all-time record against Mississippi to 2–1.

Tulane

Against the Greenies of Tulane University, Alabama lost 6–0 with the only points of the game coming on a one-yard Ellis Stearns touchdown run. The loss brought Alabama's all-time record against Tulane to 1–2.

Auburn

In what was their first meeting since the 1895 season, the Alabama Polytechnic Institute (now known as Auburn University) defeated Alabama 53–5 at Montgomery's Riverside Park. Auburn took a 24–0 lead in the first half on touchdown runs of six-yards from Thomas, 75-yards from F. R. Yarbrough and seven and eight-yards from W. L. Noll. Alabama then scored their only points of the game on a two-yard C. M. Plowman run to make the score 24–5 at the half. Auburn then scored five second half touchdown on runs of seven and eight-yards from Yarbrough, 55-yards from Noll, three-yards from Blevens and on a 25-yard Sloan punt return. The loss brought Alabama's all-time record against Auburn to 1–4.

Clemson

In the first all-time game against Clemson University, Alabama lost 35–0 on Thanksgiving Day at Birmingham's North Birmingham Park. After the Tigers forced an Alabama punt to open the game, Claude Douthit scored three consecutive touchdowns for Clemson en route to an 18–0 lead. Douthit scored first on a five-yard run, next on a short reception and finally on a second short touchdown run. N. M. Hunter then scored for Clemson on a ling run just before the break and made the halftime score 23–0. In the second half, the Tigers extended their lead to 35–0 behind a long Jim Lynah touchdown run and Douthit's fourth score of the day on a short run. With approximately 4:00 left in the game, captains from both Alabama and Clemson agreed to end the game early due to an unruly crowd and impending darkness.

Players

Notes

References

Alabama
Alabama Crimson Tide football seasons
Alabama Crimson White football